Biatora is a genus of lichens in the family Ramalinaceae. First described in 1817, the genus consists of crustose and squamulose lichens with green algal photobionts, biatorine apothecia, colorless, simple to 3-septate ascospores, and bacilliform pycnospores. According to the Dictionary of the Fungi (10th edition, 2008), the genus contains 42 species that are widely distributed in temperate areas.

Species
Biatora alaskana 
Biatora alnetorum 
Biatora appalachensis 
Biatora aureolepra 
Biatora australis 
Biatora bacidioides 
Biatora britannica 
Biatora carneoalbida 
Biatora chrysantha 

Biatora chrysanthoides 
Biatora cuprea 
Biatora cuyabensis 
Biatora efflorescens 
Biatora ementiens 
Biatora epirotica 
Biatora epixanthoides 
Biatora globulosa 
Biatora hafellneri 
Biatora halei 
Biatora hemipolia 
Biatora ivanpisutii 
Biatora kalbii 
Biatora kodiakensis 
Biatora ligni-mollis 
Biatora loekoesiana 
Biatora longispora 
Biatora meiocarpa 
Biatora nobilis 
Biatora oligocarpa 
Biatora oxneri 
Biatora pacifica 
Biatora pallens 
Biatora pausiaca 
Biatora pontica 
Biatora printzenii 
Biatora pseudosambuci 
Biatora pycnidiata 
Biatora radicicola 
Biatora subduplex 
Biatora subhispidula 
Biatora terrae-novae 
Biatora vernalis 
Biatora veteranorum 
Biatora vezdana 

The taxon Biatora marmorea, found in Alaska, was proposed as a new species in 2020; however, it is an illegitimate name as it had already been used for a species that is now known as Bagliettoa marmorea.

References

 
Lecanorales genera
Taxa named by Elias Magnus Fries
Taxa described in 1817
Lichen genera